Gamma Phi was a primarily African American fraternity founded on March 1, 1905 at Wilberforce University a historically black university in the state of Ohio by Gus Williams, Dr. Lackley and Edw. Clark.  It is notable as being one of the forerunners in the African American Collegiate Fraternal scene. 

The group was the sole fraternity on campus until the year 1912.
Charles F. Potter the fraternity historian stated in the Forcean yearbook of 1923 that the fraternity was for a time merely local.
The fraternity grew to at least three chapters, and existed on and off for many years, but the last known documentation of this fraternity occurred in 1947.

Symbols
The colors of Gamma Phi were blue and white with the official flower of the organization being a white carnation.

See also
History of North American fraternities and sororities

List of African-American Greek and fraternal organizations

References

Wilberforce University
Fraternities and sororities in the United States
African-American fraternities and sororities
1905 establishments in Ohio
Student organizations established in 1905